Pemberton Heights is a neighborhood of Austin, Texas, and part of the Old West Austin Historic District. The area is bounded by Northwood Road on the north, Lamar Boulevard/Shoal Creek on the east, 24th Street/Windsor Road on the south, and Texas State Highway Loop 1 ("MoPac") on the west. It is Austin's wealthiest and most historic neighborhood.

History
In the late 1800s, what is now the neighborhood of Pemberton Heights in Austin, Travis County, Texas, was a farm owned by Attorney General John Woods Harris. The Fisher family inherited the farm and established the Austin Land Company. In 1927, the company built a bridge across Shoal Creek and began developing the area, which was originally outside the Austin city limits. Between 1927 and the early 1940s, Pemberton Heights was developed in 12 sections. In its June 1998 issue, Town & Country magazine named Pemberton Heights as one of the 25 Platinum Addresses in the United States.

Points of interest
The neighborhood encompasses the western edge of the Shoal Creek Greenbelt along with a number of other "triangle parks" formed by three-way intersections including Harris Triangle Park, Jarratt Triangle Park, and Wooldridge Triangle Park.

Hartford Park
In 2016 the Pemberton Heights Neighborhood Association and the City of Austin formed a partnership in an effort to formally create a park in the half-acre green space found at the intersection of Hartford Rd, Jefferson St, and Ethridge Ave (1602 Ethridge Ave). The $350,000 needed for the park infrastructure was funded through private donations, and was used to fence in the area as well as add playscapes and landscaping to the park. The park officially opened on Mother's Day in 2018.

Pemberton Castle (Fisher-Gideon House)
Pemberton Castle was constructed in the 1890s, initially as a cylindrical water tower. In the 1920s it was converted into a castle. In 1927, the Austin Development Company acquired the property and used it as the office for Pemberton Heights. In 1937, Samuel Gideon, a University of Texas at Austin Professor of Architecture, acquired the property. In 1993 the house was a set in the movie Blank Check. The house is currently owned by Robert Rodriguez.

Schools
Pemberton Heights residents are zoned for Casis Elementary School, O. Henry Middle School, and Stephen F. Austin High School. However, a considerable number of students from the area also attend private schools, most notably St. Andrew's Episcopal School and St. Stephens Episcopal School among others.

Notable residents
Greg Abbott, 48th Governor of Texas
Roy Butler, Austin mayor and businessman
Edward A. Clark, United States Ambassador to Australia
Roberta Crenshaw, American parkland preservationist and philanthropist
David Dewhurst, 41st Lieutenant Governor of Texas
Lloyd Doggett, United States Representative 
O. Henry, American short story writer
Steven Hicks, American businessman
Natalie Maines, lead singer for Dixie Chicks
Jane Y. McCallum, women's suffrage leader and Texas Secretary of State
Robert Rodriguez, film director
Kendra Scott, fashion and accessories designer
John Sharp, Texas politician and chancellor of the Texas A&M University System
Max Starcke, Lower Colorado River Authority (LCRA) leader and dam namesake
Homer Thornberry, United States Representative and judge 
Kirk Watson, Austin mayor and Texas State Senator
Ralph Yarborough, United States Senator

References

External links
 Pemberton Heights Neighborhood Association

Neighborhoods in Austin, Texas